Pennsylvania Route 36 (PA 36) is a  long state highway located in the U.S. state of Pennsylvania. The southern terminus is at PA 26 near the Hopewell Township community of Yellow Creek. The northern terminus is at PA 27 and PA 227 in Pleasantville. 

One of the longest and oldest highways in the commonwealth, PA 36 serves as a major connector between South Central and Northwestern Pennsylvania. In 1955, the highway was designated as the Colonel Drake Highway in honor of Edwin Drake.

Route description

Bedford and Blair counties
PA 36 begins in the Bedford County hamlet of Yellow Creek at PA 26 along the Tussey Mountain range. 

The distance in Bedford County is brief as the highway enters Blair County and proceeds northward as the Woodbury Pike, intersecting several 800-series state highways like PA 866, PA 868, and PA 869. A short distance between Roaring Spring and the hamlet of McKee, PA 36 overlaps the east–west running PA 164. North of McKee, PA 36 becomes Catfish Ridge Road, closely paralleling the Frankstown Branch Juniata River to the west, and the Interstate 99–U.S. Route 220 overlap to the east along the Brush Mountain range.

Just south of Hollidaysburg, PA 36 has the only interchange with a non-freeway highway, Smith Road. North of Smith Road, PA 36 enters the borough as Logan Boulevard and intersects U.S. Route 22 in downtown at Blair Street. North of Hollidaysburg, PA 36 as Logan Boulevard becomes a major 4-lane divided arterial, serving the southern suburbs of Altoona. 

North of the I-99/US 220 underpass, PA 36 enters the city of Altoona. The route briefly overlaps U.S. Route 220 Business along West Plank Road. North of the overlap, PA 36 traverses the downtown areas of the city via Union Avenue and 18th street. Running on a west direction, 18th Street leads PA 36 out of Altoona, into the Appalachian Mountains and rural areas.

Cambria, Clearfield, and Jefferson counties
Near the Cambria County line, PA 36 has the first of five wrong-way concurrencies with PA 53 for a block in the hamlet of Ashville. West of the hamlet, PA 36 proceeds on a northwest direction into Clearfield County. Between the county line and the village of Mahaffey, PA 36 mostly runs parallel on the eastern banks of the Chest Creek. From Mahaffey to McGees Mills, PA 36 is overlapped with U.S. Route 219 along the northern banks of the West Branch Susquehanna River. 

The highway runs through Indiana County, passing through its far northeastern portion, for less than one mile (1.6 km). Briefly after entering Jefferson County, PA 36 takes a predominantly western course. PA traverses the borough of Punxsutawney as Main and Mahoning Streets while intersecting the Buffalo-Pittsburgh highway (U.S. Route 119) and PA 436, a spur of 36. Outside the borough, PA 36 intersects another spur, PA 536, before taking a more northern alignment. 

In Brookville, PA 36 has a three-route concurrency with U.S. Route 322 and PA 28 along Main Street. North of the overlap, PA 36 becomes Allegheny Boulevard while interchanging Interstate 80 at exit 78. North of Brookville, PA 36 runs mostly on a northern course. In the northwestern sections of the county, the road intersects PA 949 in Sigel and PA 899 near Clear Creek State Park. PA 36 exits the county running west along the southern tips of the Clarion River in Cook Forest State Park.

Clarion, Forest, and Venango counties

PA 36 enters Clarion County running westward. In the town of Leeper, the route intersects PA 66. Past Leeper, the highway runs northwest, intersecting PA 208, and exiting the county. In Forest County, PA 36 has a short overlap with U.S. Route 62, in the borough of Tionesta along the Allegheny River. In Venango County, PA 36 runs mostly northwest before reaching the northern terminus at PA 27 and PA 227 in Pleasantville.

History
PA 36 was originally designated from Pleasant Valley Boulevard (U.S. Route 220) in Altoona to PA 66 in Clarion County. From the original northern terminus to Tionesta, the highway was signed as PA 66, and from Tionesta to the current terminus, it was signed as PA 227. From Roaring Spring to the current southern terminus, it was designated as PA 426.

By 1940, the northern terminus was moved to its current location. Also by this time, the southern terminus was extended south to U.S. Route 30 west of Everett along what is today Lower Snake Spring Road and Church View Road. By 1950, the current southernmost segment of PA 36 between PA 26 and Loysburg was redesignated as PA 868. On December 21, 1955, the route was designated as the "Col. Drake Highway" in honor of Edwin L. Drake, the first to drill for oil in the United States.

By 1980, the southern terminus was moved to its current location.

Major intersections

See also

References

External links

Pennsylvania Highways: PA 36

036
Transportation in Bedford County, Pennsylvania
Transportation in Blair County, Pennsylvania
Transportation in Cambria County, Pennsylvania
Transportation in Clearfield County, Pennsylvania
Transportation in Indiana County, Pennsylvania
Transportation in Jefferson County, Pennsylvania
Transportation in Forest County, Pennsylvania
Transportation in Clarion County, Pennsylvania
Transportation in Venango County, Pennsylvania